The Assam keelback (Herpetoreas pealii), commonly known  as Peal's keelback, is a species of snake in the subfamily Natricinae of the family Colubridae. The species is endemic to Northeast India. It has recently been rediscovered after 129 years in Arunachal Pradesh.

Etymology
The specific name, pealii, is in honor of Samuel E. Peal (died 1897), an ethnographer and tea planter in Assam, who collected the two specimens from which British zoologist William Lutley Sclater described this snake as a species new to science.

Geographic range
H. pealii has been recorded from the Indian states of Assam and Arunachal Pradesh.

Description
H. pealii may attain a total length of 50 cm (19 inches), which includes a tail 12.5 cm (4 inches) long.

Dorsally, it is dark brown. On each side are two light stripes, an upper narrow one, and a broader lower one, which is two scales wide. The top of the head is dark brown. The rostral, the upper labials, and the lower labials are yellow, blotched and edged with brown. The ventrals are very dark brown, marked with light yellow laterally. There is also a faint yellow stripe along the center of the ventrals, which becomes more distinct posteriorly.

The dorsal scales are strongly keeled (less strongly in the outermost row), and arranged in 19 rows at midbody. Ventrals 142-144; anal plate entire; subcaudals 75-77, divided.

Reproduction
H. pealii is oviparous.

References

Further reading
 Sclater WL (1891). "Notes on the Collection of Snakes in the Indian Museum with descriptions of several new species". J. Asiat. Soc. Bengal 60: 230-250. (Tropidonotus pealii, new species, p. 241 + Plate VI, figures 4a, 4b, 4c).
Smith MA (1943). The Fauna of British India, Ceylon and Burma, Including the Whole of the Indo-Chinese Sub-region. Reptilia and Amphibia. Vol. III.—Serpentes. London: Secretary of State for India. (Taylor and Francis, printers). xii + 583 pp. ("Natrix peali [sic]", p. 291).

Hebius
Taxa named by William Lutley Sclater
Reptiles described in 1891